A technical decision is a term used in boxing when a fight has to be stopped because of a headbutt.

In boxing fights, referees have to pay deep attention to the action going on between the fighters, especially when the two combatants are fighting close to each other. That is because in the case of a cut, the referee must decide whether the cut was caused by a punch or a head collision. Only the referee can make that decision.

Most head collisions in boxing are probably unintentional, especially when both boxers are trying for a knockout, many times getting involved in close range fights. If a boxer intentionally butts an opponent's head, that is considered a flagrant foul that could result in disqualification of the offender.

In the case of a cut to the head, it is the referee's responsibility of taking the injured boxer to a medical doctor seated at ringside as many times as the referee thinks necessary, regardless of the referee's decision of the cut being provoked by a punch or not. When the doctor tells the referee that the combatant cannot go on, the referee must stop the fight. If the referee decided that the cut was caused by a punch, the other boxer wins by technical knockout. If the referee decides it was produced by a collision (unintentional headbutt), the judges at ringside must hand over their scorecards, and the fighter ahead on points wins by technical decision.

There are distinct rules for a fight to be decided on a technical decision as well, as fights must go beyond the fourth round for any fighter to be declared a winner by technical decision. Some federations require the fight to be in the fourth round, and other federations and most championship fights require the fight to be at minimum past the halfway point (five rounds for a 10-round match, and six rounds for a 12-round match). If a fight has to be stopped because of a headbutt without reaching the required distance, they are automatically declared a technical draw. Generally, every country where boxing is practiced accepts the four round or the halfway point as the right distance for a fight to be won or lost by technical decisions.

A unique case happened between world champions Daniel Santos and Antonio Margarito: both of their fights ended in technical decisions, which is very rare in boxing. Their first bout was declared a draw, as it had gone only one minute before being stopped, and Santos won by a ten-round split technical decision in their rematch.

One of the most controversial technical decisions in boxing history occurred in May 1994, when Julio César Chávez regained the World Boxing Council Light Welterweight title over his previous conqueror, Frankie Randall. Large percentages of both members of the media and the Pay Per View public had Randall ahead by a substantial amount when the fight was stopped in the eighth round by a cut on Chávez's head, but the judges viewed the fight otherwise, giving the fight to Chávez by a split technical decision. Boxing magazines such as The Ring and KO criticized the judges, particularly judge Ray Solis, for scoring the fight for Chávez.

See also

10 Point System

References

Boxing rules and regulations